Kuranaga may refer to:

Kuranaga Station, a train station located in Ōmuta, Fukuoka, Japan
Misa Kuranaga (born 1982/1983), Japanese ballerina